The Pacolet River is a tributary of the Broad River, about 50 miles (80 km) long, in northwestern South Carolina in the United States.  One of its principal headwaters tributaries also drains a small portion of western North Carolina.  Via the Broad and Congaree rivers, it is part of the watershed of the Santee River, which flows to the Atlantic Ocean.  The stream's name has also been spelled historically as "Pacolate River".

Course
The Pacolet is formed by the confluence of its short north and south forks:
The North Pacolet River   rises in the Blue Ridge Mountains in southeastern Henderson County, North Carolina and flows eastwardly into Polk County. It then passes near the town of Tryon and turns southeastwardly into northern Spartanburg County, South Carolina.
The South Pacolet River  rises in northeastern Greenville County, South Carolina, and flows eastwardly into northern Spartanburg County, where it passes the town of Campobello and is dammed to form William C. Bowen Lake.
The two forks join 10 miles (16 km) north-northeast of Spartanburg, and the Pacolet then flows generally southeastwardly, through or along the boundaries of Spartanburg, Cherokee and Union Counties, through Lake Blalock and past the town of Pacolet.  It joins the Broad River on the common boundary of Cherokee and Union Counties, 4 miles (6 km) north of the town of Lockhart.

In Spartanburg County the Pacolet collects Lawsons Fork Creek, which historically has also been known as "Lawsons Fork of the Pacolet River".  The creek flows for its entire length in Spartanburg County, passing through the city of Spartanburg.

See also
List of North Carolina rivers
List of South Carolina rivers

References

Rivers of North Carolina
Rivers of South Carolina
Rivers of Cherokee County, South Carolina
Rivers of Greenville County, South Carolina
Rivers of Henderson County, North Carolina
Rivers of Polk County, North Carolina
Rivers of Spartanburg County, South Carolina
Rivers of Union County, South Carolina
Tributaries of the Broad River (Carolinas)